Hang Pagoda means "Cave Temple" and may refer to many temples in Vietnam:

Hang Pagoda ( Phuoc Dien Temple ), Chau Doc, An Giang
 Hang Pagoda, My Hoa commune, Phu My District, Binh Dinh 
 Hang Pagoda ( Co Thach Tu ), Binh Thanh, Tuy Phong District, Binh Thuan 
 Hang Pagoda (Hai An Pagoda), Nha Trang, Khanh Hoa 
 Hang Pagoda, An Binh commune, Kien Luong District, Kien Giang 
 Hang Pagoda, Ly Son Island, Quang Ngai 
 Hang Pagoda, Cho Chu, Dinh Hoa District, Thai Yuan 
 Hang Pagoda, Chua Hang, Dong Hy District, Thai Yuan
 Hang Pagoda, Chau Thanh, Chau Thanh District, Tra Vinh 
 Hang Pagoda ( i.e. Chua Huong Nghiem), Khang commune, Yen Son, Tuyen Quang